Alonei Abba (lit. Abba's Oaks) is a moshav shitufi, or semi-cooperative village, in northern Israel. It was founded in 1948 on the site of the historical Palestinian village of Umm el Amad, later the German Protestant Colony of Waldheim.

It is located in the Lower Galilee near Bethlehem of Galilee and Alonim, in the hills east of Kiryat Tivon. Alonei Abba falls under the jurisdiction of the Jezreel Valley Regional Council.

History
Archaeological investigations indicate that this was an industrial agricultural processing area in the Hellenistic and Roman periods. Among the remains found are Roman-period industrial oil press and a winepress, in addition to a paved path from the same era.

Ottoman era

Umm al-Amed
Umm al-'Amad was mentioned in the Ottoman defter for the year 1555–6, as Mezraa land, (that is, cultivated land), located in the Nahiya of Tabariyya of the Liwa of Safad. The land was designated as Ziamet land. In 1799 it appeared as a village Zebed on the Carte de l'Égypte (Description de l'Égypte) of Pierre Jacotin, and in the 1880s as Umm el Amed on the PEF Survey of Palestine. The 1799 Jacotin map had not surveyed the area; it was drawn based on the notes of an inhabitant of Shefa-ʻAmr and some parts are incorrect.

In 1859, the British consul Rogers stated that the population of Umm al-Amed was 100 souls, and the tillage was ten feddans. In 1875 Victor Guérin found Umm al-Amed situated on a small plateau, surrounded by gardens. In spite of its name Umm al-Amed, which meant "The place with the columns", Guérin could find no columns.

In 1881, the Palestine Exploration Fund's Survey of Western Palestine described it as standing in oak-woods on a hill-top. There was an ancient rock-cut sepulchre on the east side. A population list from about 1887 showed that Umm el Ahmad had about 55 inhabitants; all Muslims.

Waldheim
In 1907 the colony Waldheim was founded in 1907 by German Protestants affiliated with the Old-Prussian State Church on land purchased from the fellaheen village of Umm al-Amed. Most of the colonists came from the German Colony (Haifa), which was founded by the Templers. In 1874, the Temple Society underwent a schism and envoys of the Evangelical State Church of Prussia's older Provinces successfully proselytised among the schismatics. Thus the Haifa German Colony became home to two Christian denominations and their congregations. While in Germany the Templers were regarded sectarians, the Evangelical proselytes gained major financial and ideological support from German Lutheran and United church bodies. This created an atmosphere of mistrust and envy among the German colonists in Haifa. Due to population increase and the ongoing urbanisation of Haifa, they searched for land to found new monodenominational colonies. Thus the Protestants founded Waldheim, while Templers settled in the neighbouring Bethlehem of Galilee.

The purchase price of 170,000 francs was financed by a Haifa-based bank Darlehenskasse der deutschen evangelischen Gemeinde Haifa GmbH (Loan Bank of the Haifa Evangelical Congregation Ltd.) and completely refinanced by the Stuttgarter Gesellschaft zur Förderung der deutschen Ansiedlungen in Palästina (Stuttgart-based Company for the promotion of the German colonies in Palestine). The colony comprised 7,200,000 square meters (7,200 dunams).

The settlement was inaugurated on the occasion of Harvest Festival on 6 October 1907. Then, the new Waldheimers still lived in the simple clay huts bought from the previous owners. The Haifa engineer Ernst August Voigt presented the plan of the streets and the 16 plots around a central plot, reserved for a church. By 1914, the residents planted 5,000 square metres of vineyard and more than 500 olive trees. In December 1913, the farmers of Waldheim and Bethlehem keeping dairy cattle founded a common dairy cooperative to pasteurise milk and deliver it to Haifa.

British Mandate era

Umm el Amad and Waldheim in 1918-1931
In the 1922 census of Palestine conducted by the British authorities, Umm al Amad had a population of 128; 63 Christians and 65 Muslims. Of the Christians, 62 were Protestant and 1 was Greek Catholic (Melkite). This had increased slightly in the 1931 census, when Umm el Amad had a population of 231; 163 Muslim and 68 Christians, in a total of 76 inhabited houses.

Waldheim Germans in 1932-1945
Most of the residents bore German citizenship. In 1932 the Nazi party won the first two members in Palestine. In the course of the 1930s some Waldheimers also joined the Nazi party, indicating the fading affinity to the Evangelical ideals. Until August 1939, 17% of all Gentile Germans in Palestine were enrolled as members of the Nazi party.

After the Nazi takeover in Germany, the new Reich government adapted foreign policy to Nazi ideals, based on the idea that Germany and Germanness were equal to Nazism. International schools of German language subsidised or fully financed with government funds were asked to redraw their educational programs and employ teachers aligned to the Nazi party. The teachers in Waldheim were financed by the Reich so that also here Nazi teachers took over. In 1933 German Gentiles living in Palestine appealed unsuccessfully to Paul von Hindenburg and the Foreign Office not to use Swastika symbols for German institutions. Some German Gentiles pleaded the Reich's government to drop its announced plan to boycott shops of Jewish Germans on 1 April 1933. Later the opposition of Gentile Germans in Palestine acquiesced. A Palestinian branch of the Hitler youth was built up by the help of German government subsidies. By 1935 the Nazis had succeeded to streamline the municipal bodies of the settlements of Gentile Germans in Palestine. On 20 August 1939, the German government ordered the recruitment of Gentile German men into the Wehrmacht. 350 followed the call.

After the start of the Second World War, all Germans in Palestine became enemy aliens. The British authorities decided to intern most of the enemy aliens. Sarona, Bethlehem of Galilee, Waldheim, and Wilhelma were converted into internment camps. Most enemy aliens living elsewhere in Palestine—comprising Gentile Germans, Hungarians and Italians—were interned in one of the settlements, while the inhabitants of the settlements simply stayed where they were. In summer 1941, 665 interned Templers from all their settlements, mainly young families with children, were transported to Australia for internment. Many of the remaining Germans were either too old or too sick to leave. The internees could maintain the agricultural production to feed themselves and supply surplus to market in return for supplies not available within the camps. In 1941, 1942 and 1944, by way of internee exchanges, another 400 Evangelical and Templer internees, mostly wives and children of men who had followed the call for recruitment, were repatriated, via Turkey, to Germany for family reunification.

Umm el Amad and Waldheim in 1945
In the 1945 statistics, the population of Waldheim/Um el Amad consisted of 260 people, and the total land area was 9,227 dunams, according to an official land and population survey. There were 150 Muslims and 110 Christians. 170 dunams of land were designated for plantations and irrigable land, 4,776 for cereals, while 102 dunams were built-up areas.

Final years of Waldheim, 1945-48
After the Peace of Paris the Italian and Hungarian internees were released from Waldheim and the other camps. In 1947 the British authorities and Australia agreed to allow the remaining interned Templers to emigrate to Australia.

On 17 April 1948, armed entities of the Haganah entered Waldheim, with the few British soldiers under camp commander Alan Tilbury unable to impede them, killing two colonists and severely wounding a woman. This incident and the end of the Mandate forced the British to hurry the resettlement, thus all the internees, 51 Germans and 4 Swiss, as well as those from the other settlements, were transferred to Cyprus, into a camp of simple tents near Famagusta. By 14 May 1948, when Israel became independent, only about 50 Germans, mostly elderly and sick persons, were living in the new state. They voluntarily left the country or were successively expelled by the government.

Alonei Abba

On 12 May 1948, a group of young Zionist pioneers from Czechoslovakia, Austria and Romania, members of Hanoar Hatzioni, established Kibbutz BaMa'avak (lit. In The Struggle) in the abandoned colony, after four years of agricultural training in Herzliya. Three years later, the kibbutz became a Moshav shitufi and the name was changed to Alonei Abba in memory of Abba Berdichev, who was parachuted into Czechoslovakia in 1943 to assist clandestine British forces, but was captured and executed in 1945.

Landmarks

Hans Martin Kuno Moderow (1877-1945), pastor of the Haifa Evangelical Congregation (1908–18), also provided services in Waldheim, at the beginning in the living room of the new house of Waldheim's then mayor Gottlob Weinmann. The Waldheimers saved funds for a church of their own and could thus lay the cornerstone for the church in early 1914. The Haifa-based architect Otto Lutz led the construction works. In 1921, the Evangelical church at Alonei Abba, which still stands today, was inaugurated. The Alon winery, surrounded by a grove of oak trees, is located in the former dairy cooperative (est. 1913).

Alonei Abba nature reserve
In 1994, a 950-dunam nature reserve was declared close by, to the north. The reserve is home to Valonia oak trees (Quercus macrolepis) and Palestine oak (Quercus calliprinos). Other flora in the forest includes terebinths (Pistacia terebinthus), storax trees (Styrax officinalis), carobs (Ceratonia siliqua), buckthorns (Rhamnus palaestinus), and Judas trees (Cercis siliquastrum). Most of the reserve is open for experimental grazing by cattle from the moshav.

Notable residents
Shlomo Artzi, musician
Meir Shalev, writer

References

Bibliography

Carmel, Alex (אלכס כרמל), Die Siedlungen der württembergischen Templer in Palästina (1868–1918) (11973), [התיישבות הגרמנים בארץ ישראל בשלהי השלטון הטורקי: בעיותיה המדיניות, המקומיות והבינלאומיות, ירושלים :חמו"ל, תש"ל; German], Stuttgart: Kohlhammer, 32000, (Veröffentlichungen der Kommission für geschichtliche Landeskunde in Baden-Württemberg: Reihe B, Forschungen; vol. 77). .

 
 Eisler, Ejal Jakob (איל יעקב איזלר), "«Kirchler» im Heiligen Land: Die evangelischen Gemeinden in den württembergischen Siedlungen Palästinas (1886–1914)" [title translated into "Church proselytes" in the Holy Land: The Protestant congregations within the Württembergian settlements of Palestine (1886–1914)], In: Dem Erlöser der Welt zur Ehre: Festschrift zum hundertjährigen Jubiläum der Einweihung der evangelischen Erlöserkirche in Jerusalem, Karl-Heinz Ronecker (ed.) on behalf of the 'Jerusalem-Stiftung' and 'Jerusalemsverein', Leipzig: Evangelische Verlags-Anstalt, 1998, pp. 81–100. .

 
 

 Moderow, Hans	Martin Kuno, Deutsches evangelisches Leben am Karmel [title translated into German Protestant life at the Carmel], Potsdam: Stiftungsverlag, 1910.
 

 

Sauer, Paul: Vom Land um den Asperg im Namen Gottes nach Palästina und Australien: Die wechselvolle Geschichte der Tempelgesellschaft, lecture held on 20 October 1995 in Burgstetten on the occasion of the 750th anniversary of Kirschenhardthof, printed as Schriftenreihe TG, No. 1 (1996)

External links
Survey of Western Palestine, Map 5:  IAA, Wikimedia commons

1948 establishments in Israel
Austrian-Jewish culture in Israel
Romanian-Jewish culture in Israel
Moshavim
Former kibbutzim
Populated places established in 1948
Templer settlements
Nature reserves in Israel
Protected areas of Northern District (Israel)
Populated places in Northern District (Israel)
1907 establishments in the Ottoman Empire